Didmus Wekesa Barasa is a Kenyan politician and ex-military officer (Kenya Defense Forces technical wing). He is the current member of parliament representing Kimilili constituency since 2017.

He became affiliated to the United Democratic Alliance party shortly after his exit from the Jubilee Party in 2021. Barasa is a former member of Amani Peace Coalition (2013), United Democratic Forum Party (2016) and the Jubilee Party.

During his first parliamentary term, Barasa did not sponsor any bills. He holds a bachelor's degree in Electrical and Electronics Engineering from Jomo Kenyatta University of Agriculture and Technology.

On 9 August, just after the polls closed for the 2022 Kenyan general election, a manhunt for Barasa was launched after a shooting incident which killed a security guard for Barasa's electoral rival, Brian Khaemba of the Democratic Action Party-Kenya, which is aligned to the Azimio La Umoja alliance. He turned himself in to the police 3 days later and subsequently released on bail of KS10 million (USD$83,000).

References 

Year of birth missing (living people)
Living people
21st-century Kenyan politicians
Members of the National Assembly (Kenya)
Jubilee Party politicians
United Democratic Alliance (Kenya) politicians
Members of the 12th Parliament of Kenya
Members of the 13th Parliament of Kenya